Chalma is a village (pueblo) in the Mexican state of Veracruz. It is located in the state's Huasteca Alta region. It serves as the municipal seat for the surrounding municipality of Chalma. 

In the 2005 INEGI Census, the village of Chalma  reported a total population of 2,555.

References

Populated places in Veracruz